Leymus ambiguus is a species of grass known by the common names Colorado wildrye and Rocky Mountain wildrye. It is native to the Rocky Mountains of the United States, growing mainly on rocky hillsides on the eastern slopes of the mountains in Colorado and New Mexico; it has also been reported from Utah. It is a climax species on the dry grasslands of the Colorado Front Range.

It is sometimes rhizomatous. Most of the leaves are located around the bases of the stems. The inflorescence is up to about 17 centimeters long and has solitary or paired spikelets, each containing up to 7 to 10 flowers. The grass has been noted to produce about 390 seeds per plant. The seeds germinate well and the seedlings grow fast.

References

External links
USDA Plants Profile for Leymus ambiguus
The Nature Conservancy

ambiguus
Grasses of the United States
Flora of the Rocky Mountains
Flora of Colorado
Flora of New Mexico
Endemic flora of the United States